Independence is a small cruise ship owned and operated by American Cruise Lines (ACL). She was built in 2010 by Chesapeake Shipbuilding in Salisbury, Maryland for overnight coastal, river, and inland waterway cruising within the continental United States.

References

External links
 Independence on American Cruise Lines website
 Independence - American Cruise Lines from Frommer's
 American Cruise Lines' focus is historic U.S. waterways from The Palm Beach Post

2010 ships
Cruise ships of the United States
Ships built in Salisbury, Maryland